Stenoma minor is a moth in the family Depressariidae. It was described by August Busck in 1914. It is found in Panama.

The wingspan is about 8 mm. The forewings are dark purplish brown, with strong metallic reflections. The costal edge at the apical fourth is touched with white. The hindwings are dark brown.

References

Moths described in 1914
Stenoma